Vrapčište (is a municipality in western North Macedonia. Vrapčište is also the name of the village where the municipal seat is found. This municipality is part of the Polog Statistical Region.

Geography
The municipality borders Bogovinje Municipality to the north, Brvenica Municipality to the east, and Gostivar Municipality to the south, Kosovo to the west.

Demographics

According to the last national census from 2021, this municipality has 19,842 inhabitants. Ethnic groups in the municipality include:

References

 
Polog Statistical Region
Municipalities of North Macedonia
Albanian communities in North Macedonia

tr:Vrapçişte